Stingwern Hill, or ‘the Stingwern’ is a marilyn near Manafon in Mid Wales. Its summit is approximately 355 metres above sea level and has a prominence of 180 metres. The summit of the Stingwern lies within private land and is not accessible to the public.

References

Marilyns of Wales